The Malaysia national beach soccer team represents Malaysia in international beach soccer competitions and is controlled by the Football Association of Malaysia, the governing body for football in Malaysia.

Current squad

Coaching Staffs
 Team Manager:  Mustaza Ahmad
 Head Coach:  Mohd Faizal Md So'od
 Assistant Coach:  Saiful Noor
 Physiotherapist:  Isamuddin Ali Wahid Ali

Achievements

Beach Soccer World Cup
{| class="wikitable" style="text-align: center;"
|-
!Year
!Round
!width=20|Pos
!width=20|Pld
!width=20|W
!width=20|Waet/pso
!width=20|L
!width=20|GF
!width=20|GA
!width=20|GD
|- style="background:=;"
|Brazil 1995
|rowspan=4 colspan=9|did not enter
|-
|Brazil 1996
|-
|Brazil 1997
|- 
|Brazil 1998
|- 
|Brazil 1999||Group Stage||10||2||0||0||2||9||22||-13|- 
|Brazil 2000
|rowspan=5 colspan=9|did not enter
|- 
|Brazil 2001
|- 
|Brazil 2002
|- 
|Brazil 2003
|- 
|Brazil 2004
|-
|Total||0 Title||1/10||2||0||0||2||9||22||-13'|}

AFC Beach Soccer ChampionshipThe tournament also call as FIFA Beach Soccer World Cup qualification for Asian (AFC) region.''

Asian Beach Games

AFF Beach Soccer Championship

References

 http://www.aseanfootball.org/results/AFF-FELDA_BEACH_SOCCER_CHAMPIONSHIP2014-MatchSummary-007.pdf Retrieved 2015-04-18.
 http://www.beachsoccer.com/teams/Malaysia Retrieved 2015-04-18.

External links
 http://www.the-afc.com/competition/afc-beach-soccer-championship
 http://www.aseanfootball.org/v2/?page_id=6982

Asian national beach soccer teams
National sports teams of Malaysia